Isaac Watts (1797–1876) was an early British naval architect. Together with Chief Engineer Thomas Lloyd, he designed HMS Warrior, the world's first armour-plated iron-hulled warship. When he retired his position as Chief Constructor was taken by Edward Reed.

References

External links
ODNB entry

1797 births
1876 deaths
British naval architects
19th-century British businesspeople